Bayou Pierre is a partially man-made bayou in Louisiana, United States. It is a tributary of the Red River merging west from the town of Clarence, Louisiana.

Sources
Bayou Pierre starts in various ditches across Shreveport which flow together. Although it doesn't merge with the Red River until it is much more southerly, two bodies composed of solely water from ditches meet to form Sandy Beach Bayou, a marshy area near the Red River. It later connects to Tones Bayou, which branches off from the Red River. From there, it meets a tributary, also called Bayou Pierre, from the dam of Wallace Lake. After this, the Bayou Pierre Wildlife Management Area is ran through by the waters. Then, it meets the Prarire River and then the Watson Bayou. Much later, it meets Black Bayou (Central Louisiana) to form Bayou Lumbra.  Because of the very small amount of source water and level terrain, it flows very slowly.

Wildlife Management Area 
In Frierson, Louisiana, there is a wildlife area for Bayou Pierre and marshes. In this land, there are 2,799 acres. The land is owned by the Louisiana Department of Wildlife and Fisheries (LDWF). They allow hunting, trapping, and ornithology. Also, camping is allowed at specific areas.

History 
In the early 1990s, farmers drained the area and destroyed the ecosystem. However, the farming attempts backfired assumedly because of poor soil absorption. The farmers gave up and deeded the land to the LDWF.

Ecosystem 
The ecosystem is known to contain white-tailed deer, raccoons, sandpipers, dove, rabbits, and many types of waterfowl. In the winter, sandpipers flock to the area. Additionally, the area floods occasionally due to poor soil absorption.

Fort Selden
Fort Selden was situated at the junction of Bayou Pierre and Red River in Natchitoches Parish, Louisiana.

References

Rivers of Louisiana
Tributaries of the Mississippi River